Colostygia kollariaria is a moth of the  family Geometridae. It is found in the Alps and the Carpathian Mountains on altitudes between 500 and 2,000 meters.

Adults are in wing from May to August.

The larvae feed on the flowers of Valeriana tripteris. It overwinters in the pupal stage.

References

External links

Lepiforum.de
schmetterlinge-deutschlands.de

Cidariini
Moths described in 1848
Moths of Europe
Taxa named by Gottlieb August Wilhelm Herrich-Schäffer